Mykolaivka is a village in Luhansk Raion (district) in Luhansk Oblast of eastern Ukraine, at about 12.4 km ENE from the centre of Luhansk city, on the right bank of the Siverskyi Donets river.

The settlement was taken under control of pro-Russian forces during the War in Donbass, that started in 2014.

Demographics
In 2001 the settlement had 2,135 inhabitants. Native language as of the Ukrainian Census of 2001:
Ukrainian — 34.57%
Russian — 64.22%
Others — 1.21%

References

Villages in Luhansk Raion